The following is a list of all songs by The Velvet Underground, excluding those after the departure of Lou Reed on the Squeeze album and the reunion tour. This list details the name of the song and any officially released recordings of the song. In the case of studio recordings, the album title and date of album release have been included. In the case of live recordings, demos or rehearsal recordings, the date of recording and album the track appears on have been included.

The songs, in alphabetical order, are as follows:

A

B

C

E

F

G

H

I

J

L

M

N

O

P

R

S

T

V

W

Unreleased songs

See also
The Velvet Underground discography

References

 
Velvet Underground, The